Karen Shin (born 5 July, 1968) is an American former professional tennis player.

Shin won the CIF Southern Section singles championship as a Chaminade College senior in 1985, then played college tennis at UC Berkeley, where she was a four-time All-American.

Following her time at UC Berkeley, Shin competed briefly on the international circuit and reached a career high singles ranking of 176 in the world. Her best performance on the WTA Tour was a second round appearance at the Virginia Slims of Arizona in 1989.

ITF finals

Singles: 2 (2–0)

References

External links
 
 

1968 births
Living people
American female tennis players
California Golden Bears women's tennis players